Savigny is a commune in the Rhône department in eastern France.

Savigny was the site of the Abbey of Saint-Martin during the Middle Ages.

See also
Communes of the Rhône department

References

Communes of Rhône (department)